The Marion Battelle Three-Decker is a historic triple decker residence in Worcester, Massachusetts.  It is a well-preserved and detailed example of a triple decker with Queen Anne styling.  It is built with typical side hall plan, with a hip roof punctured by a gable dormer on the front facade.   At the time of its listing on the National Register of Historic Places in 1990, it included detailing such as decoratively bracketed eave, and its turret-like front bay window was decorated with alternating bands of patterned shingles.  Since then the exterior has been modified by the application of modern siding, and these details have been lost or obscured.

See also
National Register of Historic Places listings in southwestern Worcester, Massachusetts
National Register of Historic Places listings in Worcester County, Massachusetts

References

Apartment buildings in Worcester, Massachusetts
Apartment buildings on the National Register of Historic Places in Massachusetts
Queen Anne architecture in Massachusetts
Houses completed in 1896
National Register of Historic Places in Worcester, Massachusetts